Lärm (German for noise) were a Dutch straight edge hardcore band formed in 1981, first playing under the name of Total Chaoz. They referred to their music as "extreme noise", though having nothing to do with noise rock or noise music.

Due to members being straight edge, which was something uncommon in the crust punk scene, Lärm were different from many bands at the time. Members went on to form Seein Red and the communist straight edge band Manliftingbanner, who played in a more conventional hardcore punk style.

Discography
 1984 - Campaign for Musical Destruction (split LP with Stanx; Eenheidsfront Records)
 1986 - End the Warzone compilation 7-inch (One Step Ahead Records)
 1986 - No One Can Be That Dumb 7-inch (own release)
 1986 - Straight on View LP (One Step Ahead Records)
 1987 - Nothing Is Hard in This World if You Dare to Scale the Heights 7-inch (Definite Choice)
 1995 - Destroy Sexism 7-inch (Wicked Witch, demo recordings)
 2004 - Lärm as Fuck / Humus split 7-inch (Wasted Youth Power Records, re-recordings by Seein Red with Roy All Tensed Up on vocals)
 2010 - Lärm (Way Back When Records, re-recordings with original singer Menno)

Reissues
 1997 - "Extreme Noise" (Coalition Records)

References

External links
 Marxbros bandcamp

Straight edge groups
Dutch hardcore punk groups
Musical groups established in 1981